Doodle Jump is a platforming video game developed and published by Croatian studio Lima Sky, for Windows Phone, iPhone OS, BlackBerry, Android, Java Mobile (J2ME), Nokia Symbian, and Xbox 360 for the Kinect platform. It was released worldwide for iPhone OS on March 15, 2009, and was later released for Android and Blackberry on March 2, 2010, Symbian on May 1, 2010, Windows Phone 7 on June 1, 2011, and August 21, 2013, on Windows Phone 8. It was released for the iPad on September 1, 2011. Since its release, the game has been generally well received. The game is currently available on nine platforms.

Doodle Jump was renowned for its selling rate by App Store standards, which counted 25,000 copies sold daily for 4 consecutive months (later overtaken by Angry Birds). As of December, 2011, the game sold 10 million copies over iTunes and Google Play and reached 15 million downloads across all platforms. The game has been developed into a video redemption game for play at video arcades. Croatians Igor and Marko Pušenjak are authors of Doodle Jump, where Igor works from a New York-based address and Marko resides in Croatia. In July 2016, Lima Sky announced a partnership with Skillz to develop a tournament-playable version of the game.

On December 20, 2020, Doodle Jump 2 was released on the App Store.

Gameplay

In Doodle Jump, the aim is to guide a four-legged creature called "The Doodler" up a never-ending series of platforms without falling. The left side of the playing field wraps around to the right side. For devices with an accelerometer, players tilt the device from side to side to move the Doodler in the desired direction. 

Players can get a short boost from various objects, such as propeller hats, jetpacks, rockets, springs, trampolines and invulnerability shields (some levels only). There are also monsters and UFOs that the Doodler must avoid, shoot, or jump on to eliminate. Aiming is performed by tapping on different parts of the screen, on the Android and Windows Phone versions of the game there is also an automatic aim mode. Depending on the game mode being played, projectiles may fly in a straight line off the screen or be affected by gravity and fall downwards. 

There is no definitive end to the game, but the end for each gameplay session happens when the player falls to the bottom of the screen, jumps into a monster, gets sucked into a black hole, or is abducted by a UFO. 

Players can choose from several different themes including Original, Christmas, Halloween, Rainforest, Space, Soccer World Cup, Underwater, Easter, Ice Blizzard, Retro Arcade, Ninja or Pirate. The themes change the look of the Doodle Jumper, his enemies, and the background. In the Ninja, Pirate, Halloween, and Easter modes, the player can buy new skins and extra lives with coins that can be earned in gameplay but may also be purchased. Furthermore, the player may enter the names of one of the Pocket God pygmies and the Doodler will turn into one of the pygmies. Alternatively, the player can enter the name "Bunny" and the Doodler will wear a bunny suit, just like the one in the Easter stage.

There are also two other separate apps for iPhone OS, Doodle Jump Christmas Special (a new Christmas theme), Doodle Jump Hop, (a new Easter theme) where the player character is E.B. from the movie Hop, and Doodle Jump SpongeBob SquarePants, where the player character is the eponymous character.

A free version also exists. This version is nearly identical to the original, but features such as UFOs are not present, advertisements are shown and there is a limit to how high the Doodler goes.

Reception
Doodle Jump has received favorable reviews from critics, with TouchGen mentioning the fact that the game is 'fun as heck' and also praising the sound and cartoon graphics which they feel give the game charm. The review ends by saying that the game is a 'joy to play' and that it's obvious that a 'lot of love went into this game'. Tom Love of Pocket Gamer called the game "unbelievably addictive, immediately accessible, and enjoyable every time you pick it up". It currently holds a rating of 85.00% based on 6 reviews on GameRankings.

Cultural references
 The Doodler has made cameo appearances in several other iPhone games, such as Parachute Panic, The Creeps, Finger Physics and Pocket God, just like the Pocket God Pygmies are playable in Doodle Jump.
 The game was mentioned in passing by Sheldon Cooper on The Big Bang Theory, and Pocket Gamer speculated that the game reached 1 million downloads shortly after as a result.
 In 2012, the company Sprint ran a commercial featuring Kevin Durant that implies a viewer missing a sport game's winning shot because they had used up all their data plan quota by downloading Doodle Jump.

See also
List of most downloaded Android applications

References

External links
Doodle Jump homepage

2009 video games
Accelerometer-based mobile games
Android (operating system) games
Arcade video games
BlackBerry games
Casual games
IOS games
Kinect games
Multiplayer and single-player video games
Nintendo 3DS eShop games
Nintendo 3DS games
Nintendo DS games
Video games adapted into comics
Video games developed in Croatia
Windows Phone games
Xbox 360 Live Arcade games
Platform games
Apple Design Awards recipients
J2ME games